Philip E. Nelson (born September 1, 1891) was a Republican member of the Wisconsin State Senate from 1931 to 1943.

Biography
Nelson represented the 11th District. He resided in Maple, Wisconsin, and was a delegate to the 1936 Republican National Convention. Born in Curtiss, Wisconsin, he went to Williams Business School in Oshkosh, Wisconsin. He was an accountant, managed cheese factories, and owned a general store. He served in the United States Army during World War I. He served on the Douglas County, Wisconsin Board of Supervisors. Previously, he had served two terms in the Wisconsin State Assembly.

References

See also
The Political Graveyard

1891 births
Year of death unknown
People from Clark County, Wisconsin
People from Douglas County, Wisconsin
Businesspeople from Wisconsin
Republican Party Wisconsin state senators
County supervisors in Wisconsin
Military personnel from Wisconsin
United States Army personnel of World War I
Republican Party members of the Wisconsin State Assembly